The Penn State Nittany Lions women represented Penn State University in CHA women's ice hockey during the 2014-15 NCAA Division I women's ice hockey season. The Nittany Lions finished conference play in third place, and advanced to the CHA Tournament Semi-Final, before losing to Syracuse 2-0.

Standings

Offseason
August 25: 2014 graduate Jenna Welch signed a professional contract to play for the DEC Salzburg Eagles in the Elite Women's Hockey League.

Recruiting

Roster

2014–15 Nittany Lions

Schedule

|-
!colspan=12 style=""| Regular Season

|-
!colspan=12 style=""| CHA Tournament

Awards and honors

Laura Bowman, 2014-15 All-CHA Second Team
Hannah Ehersmann, 2014-15 All-CHA Rookie Team
Bella Sutton, 2014-15 All-CHA Rookie Team

References

Penn State
Penn State women's ice hockey seasons